The 2019 FINA Diving World Series, also known as the FINA/CNSG Diving World Series for sponsorship reasons, took place from 1 March to 19 May 2019. It was the tenth edition of the FINA-sanctioned invitational series, and included five events across three continents.

Calendar

The calendar for the 2019 series was announced by FINA in July 2018.

Event 1:  Sagamihara

The first event took place at the Sagamihara Green Pool in Sagamihara, Japan from 1–3 March.

Medal table

Medal summary

Men

Women

Mixed

Event 2:  Beijing

The second event took place at the Beijing National Aquatics Center in Beijing, China from 7–9 March.

Medal table

Medal summary

Men

Women

Mixed

Event 3:  Montreal

The third event took place in at Montreal Olympic Pool in Montreal, Canada from 26–28 April.

Medal table

Medal summary

Men

Women

Mixed

Event 4:  Kazan

The fourth event took place at Kazan Aquatics Palace in Kazan, Russia from 10–12 May.

Medal table

Medal summary

Men

Women

Mixed

Event 5:  London

The fifth event took place at London Aquatics Centre in London, Great Britain from 17–19 May.

Medal table

Medal summary

Men

Women

Mixed

References

External links

FINA Diving World Series
FINA Diving World Series